Pauliena Rooijakkers (born 12 May 1993) is a road cyclist from the Netherlands, who currently rides for UCI Women's WorldTeam . She participated at the 2012 UCI Road World Championships in the Women's team time trial for the  team.

Major results
2014
 1st  National Beach Race Championships

2015
 1st  National Beach Race Championships
 1st Egmond-pier-Egmond

2016
 1st  UEC European Beach Race Championships
 1st  National Beach Race Championships

2017
 1st  National Beach Race Championships

2018
 1st  UEC European Beach Race Championships
 1st  National Beach Race Championships
 8th Overall Emakumeen Euskal Bira

2021
 4th Overall Tour Cycliste Féminin International de l'Ardèche
1st  Mountains classification
1st  Combination classification
 8th Emakumeen Nafarroako Klasikoa
 9th Overall Vuelta a Burgos Feminas
 10th Overall Challenge by La Vuelta
 10th Brabantse Pijl

2022
 1st Durango-Durango Emakumeen Saria
 6th Brabantse Pijl
 10th Overall Grand Prix Elsy Jacobs

See also
2013 Boels Dolmans Cycling Team season
2014 Parkhotel Valkenburg Continental Team season
2015 Parkhotel Valkenburg Continental Team season

References

External links
 

1993 births
Living people
Dutch female cyclists
People from Venray
Cyclists from Limburg (Netherlands)
21st-century Dutch women